Debrett's is a British professional coaching company, publisher and authority on etiquette and behaviour, founded in 1769 with the publication of the first edition of The New Peerage. The company takes its name from its founder, John Debrett.

Coaching
Debrett's Academy was established in 2012 to provide coaching in (i.e., enhancing) interpersonal skills to individuals and corporations. Its courses for businesses cover topics such as public speaking, networking, sales pitches, relationship management, personal presentation and dress codes. Its private client courses focus on confidence-building and social competence, as well as personal presentation and impact, career progression and digital networking.

A non-profit arm, Debrett's Foundation, provides coaching through the Debrett's Academy to sixth form students from UK schools in business skills, as well as access to internships, work experience and mentoring opportunities.

Publications
Debrett's has published a range of guides on traditional British etiquette, dating from the mid 1900s. Those currently in print include Debrett's A–Z of Modern Manners, Debrett's Guide for the Modern Gentleman and Debrett's Handbook, a revised and updated version of its Correct Form. Debrett's Wedding Guide (first published in 2007) was revised in 2017 and published as Debrett's Wedding Handbook.

Debrett's Peerage & Baronetage, a book which includes a short history of the family of each titleholder, was previously published roughly every five years. The last printed edition was the 2019 and 150th edition, published in the company's 250th year. Charles Kidd was the editor of the Peerage for nearly 40 years; he was the consulting editor on the last edition, which was edited by Susan Morris, Wendy Bosberry-Scott and Gervase Belfield of Debrett Ancestry Research Ltd, a sister company of Debrett's.

Debrett's [Illustrated Heraldic and Biographical] House of Commons and the Judicial Bench was published from 1867 to 1931. Butler calls it "particularly useful".

Debrett's People of Today 

Debrett's People of Today, an annual publication between 1988 and 2017, contained biographical details of approximately 20,000 notable people from the entire spectrum of British society. The selection of entrants was made by the editorial staff of Debrett's and entries were reviewed annually to ensure accuracy and relevance. Entries include details of career, education, family, recreations and membership of clubs as well as contact addresses.

A feature was the style of address to be used when addressing correspondence to an entrant. The last edition of this book was published in 2017. Like its rival publication Who's Who, selection of entrants was at the editorial team's discretion and there was no payment or obligation to purchase. Unlike Who's Who, entries were removed if the subjects were no longer deemed to be suitable for inclusion.

Debrett's 500
Since 2014 Debrett's has published an annual list of the UK's 500 most influential people across 24 sectors. In 2017 the list was published in the Saturday Telegraph Magazine.

Debrett's website
Debrett's website contains information on British tradition, etiquette, dress codes and style, and the biographical profiles of those featured in People of Today and the Debrett’s 500.

John Debrett

John Debrett (8 January 1753 – 15 November 1822) was the London-born son of Jean Louys de Bret, a French cook of Huguenot extraction and his wife Rachel Panchaud. As a boy of thirteen, John Debrett was apprenticed to a Piccadilly bookseller and publisher, Robert Davis. He remained there until 1780, when he moved across Piccadilly to work for John Almon, bookseller and stationer. John Almon edited and published his first edition of The New Peerage in 1769, and went on to produce at least three further editions.

By 1790 he had passed the editorship on to John Debrett who, in 1802, put his name to the two small volumes that made up The Correct Peerage of England, Scotland and Ireland. Despite twice being declared bankrupt, Debrett continued as a bookseller and editor of the Peerage. The last edition edited by him was the 15th edition, which was published in 1823. He was found dead at his lodgings on 15 November 1822, and was buried at St James's Church, Piccadilly.

John Debrett married on 27 April 1787 in Piccadilly to Sophia Granger (1762–1833), daughter of Captain John Granger and Sophia Spencley. They had six children, none of whom followed their father into the book trade although Sophia did work with her husband and at one point ran the business herself.

Appearances in popular culture
In the opening pages of Jane Austen's Persuasion (1818), the vain and snobbish Sir Walter Elliot loves to look at his own family's entry in Debrett's.

An out-of-date Debrett's is a key plot element in an Elizabeth Mapp story (1920–1939) by E. F. Benson.

In series three of the television series Downton Abbey, Lady Cora Grantham mentions Debrett's in jest when defending the choice of her late daughter, Sybil, to have her daughter baptised as Catholic.

There was a storyline in Doonesbury where Zonker had a large cash windfall with which he planned to purchase a British peerage. To prepare for his new role, he had a friend quiz him from Debrett's, to great comic effect.

In Brideshead Revisited by Evelyn Waugh, Sebastian and Charles visit Brideshead together for the first time, and  Sebastian will not let Charles meet his family. He comments: "You don't know what you've been saved. There are lots of us. Look them up in Debrett."

In Montague Rhodes James's The Residence at Whitminster, Uncle Oldys draws his information about the spooking Viscount Kildonan from Debrett's Peerage: "It's all in Debrett's – two little fat books".

See also
Almanach de Gotha
Burke's Peerage
Carnet Mondain
High Life de Belgique
Libro d'Oro
Powerlist
Social Register
 Kulavruttanta

References

Bibliography
 Hankinson, Cyril Francis James. My Forty Years with Debrett. London: R. Hale, 1963.
"Debrett" (1868–1869) 9 The Reliquary, Quarterly Archaeological Journal and Review 124

External links
 
 

 7th edition – 1809 – Volume 1 – Hathitrust
 7th edition – 1809 – Volume 2 – Hathitrust
 10th edition – 1816 – Volume 1 – Archive.org
 10th edition – 1816 – Volume 1 – Hathitrust
 10th edition – 1816 – Volume 2 – Hathitrust
  13th edition – 1820 – Volume 1 – Internet Archive
 13th edition – 1820 – Volume 1 – Archive.org
 13th edition – 1820 – Volume 2 – Archive.org
 14th edition – 1822 – Volume 1 – Hathitrust
 14th edition – 1822 – Volume 2 – Hathitrust
 14th edition – 1822 – Volume 2 – Google Books
 15th edition – 1825 – Volume 1 – Google Books
 15th edition – 1825 – Volume 2 – Archive.org
 17th edition – 1828 – Volume 1 – Archive.org
 17th edition – 1828 – Volume 2 – Archive.org
 19th edition – 1831 – Volume 1 – Hathitrust
 19th edition – 1831 – Volume 2 – Hathitrust
 19th edition – 1831 – Volume 2 – Archive.org
 22nd edition – 1838 – Archive.org
 22nd edition, with additions – 1839 – Google Books
  1840 – Internet Archive
 1840 – Archive.org
 1847 – Google Books
 1847 – Hathitrust
 1864 – Google Books
 1865 – Google Books
 1865 – Hathitrust
 1869 – Hathitrust
 1876 – Archive.org
 1893 – Archive.org
 1903 – Archive.org
 1921 – Archive.org
 1936 – Archive.org
 2019 – Google Books

English society
British biographical dictionaries
Publishing companies established in the 1760s
Peerages in the United Kingdom
1769 establishments in England
Companies established in 1769